Rosario Gagliardi (1698–1762) was an Italian architect born in Syracuse. He was one of the leading architects working in the Sicilian Baroque. In spite of never leaving Sicily his work showed great understanding of the style, but was a progression from the style of baroque as deployed by Bernini. He worked mostly in the Sicilian Baroque beginning with the cathedral at Modica in 1702.

When evaluating his work at San Giorgio in Modica, and the domed Basilica of San Giorgio in Ragusa (designed 1738, built 1744–66), it appears incredible that he was completely untravelled. As the Sicilian baroque style evolved so too did the accomplishment of his work. The Church of San Giorgio is thought to be the prototype for all the other churches in the region. Gagliardi was also responsible for numerous other churches and palazzi in Noto and other places on the island.

He died in Noto in 1762 aged 64 years old.

Further reading

 

1698 births
1762 deaths
People from Syracuse, Sicily
18th-century Italian architects
Italian Baroque architects
Architects from Sicily
Architects of the Sicilian Baroque